Marc Johnson (born January 6, 1977) is an American professional skateboarder.

Sponsors
As of May 2017, Johnson's sponsors are listed as Adidas, Thunder, Spitfire, ABC Hat Co., MOB griptape, Andale Bearings, Loud Headphones, and Glassy Sunhaters.

The Back Forty
The "Back Forty" project was launched in mid-2013/early 2014 and is a collaboration between Johnson, Kenny Anderson and Chris Roberts—Johnson asserted in a March 2014 interview that, while the project sells products, it is not a "company." On the "About" section of the Back Forty's Facebook page, the project is self-defined as a commitment to: "Becoming the voice for what skateboarding has to say for itself." Johnson further explained: "We have tons of ideas that don't belong anywhere else ... Back Forty's a home for all the ideas that we have that don't really vibe with anything else that we're involved in."

Johnson appeared on episode #36 of The Nine Club hosted by Chris Roberts. While technically unrelated to The Back Forty, The Nine Club podcast shows a clear vision of furthering the missions of the latter project and generating skateboarding culture, history, and business content by and for skateboarders.

In a 2007 Thrasher interview, Johnson explained his inspiration in the following manner:

I've wondered about that. This is going to sound bizarre to most people, but ALL inspiration comes from something similar to the way a radio works. If you imagine that everything ever known or will be known exists between the lowest and the highest frequencies, we simply either stumble upon a brilliant song accidentally, or we spend our lives searching for great songs and find them where we may. Invention works like that. I think Tesla said something to that effect: We are simply filters for Divine Knowledge.

Professional skateboarder Paul Rodriguez included Johnson in his "top ten" list of favorite professional skateboarders in July 2013. Rodriguez praised Johnson as "a boss" with "incredible style" and "incredible technical capabilities." The list was published on Rodriguez's personal website and he concluded with the statement, "I think he is one of the all time greats for sure."

Personal life
In August 2012, Johnson's residence was in a semi-isolated, mountainous area of California called Crest Line. Johnson has announced he is starting a new skateboard company called Business & Company via social media

Videography
 Maple: Rites of Passage (1994)
 Etnies: High 5 (1995)
 Maple: Promo (1995)
 Transworld: Uno (1996)
 Maple: Seven Steps To Heaven (1996)
 NC Board Shop: Montage (1996)
 411VM: Best Of 411, Volume 4 (1997)
 411VM: Issue 20 (1997)
 Emerica: Yellow (1997)
 Transworld: Modus Operandi (2000)
 Transworld: Anthology (2000)
 NC: Tilt Mode! (2000)
 ON Video: Spring 2001 (2001)
 ON Video: Summer 2001 (2001)
 Tilt Mode Army: Man Down (2001)
 Thrasher: Jaded (2002)
 Lakai: Beware Of The Flare (2002)
 411VM: Issue 60 (2003)
 Girl: Yeah Right! (2003)
 Closure (2003) – independent Dan Wolfe production
 Chocolate: Hot Chocolate (2004)
 Chocolate: Se Habla Canuck (2004)
 Girl: What Tour? (2005)
 Lakai: The Red Flare Tour (2005)
 Elwood: 1st & Hope (2006)
 Matix: Grateful Shred Tour (2006)
 Lakai: Fully Flared (2007)
 Girl/Chocolate: Badass Meets Dumbass (2007)
 Lakai: The Final Flare! (2008)
 Lakai: 2010 Video Collection (2010)
 Lakai: Voltage (2010)
 Thrasher: King Of The Road 2011 (2011)
 Girl/Chocolate: Pretty Sweet (2012)
Lakai: Lost & Lakai'd (2013) 

Johnson stated in a 2012 interview that he has selected the music for all of his career video parts.

References

1977 births
American skateboarders
Living people